{{DISPLAYTITLE:NRH2O}}

NRH2O Family Water Park, stylized as NRH2O, is a water park located in North Richland Hills, Texas, owned by the City of North Richland Hills.

The park opened in 1995 and contains water slides, a swimming pool, a wave pool, and a lazy river.

History 
In 1995, NRH2O opened as the first city-owned water park in Texas. At the time, the park had three water slides, a river, and a swimming pool. The park added "dive in" movies that guests could watch while at the park.

In 2004, a 12 year-old girl died after collapsing at the water park. The city was sued by the girl's family in case that went up to the Supreme Court of Texas.

In 2014, a 7 year-old boy died after collapsing at the water park.

In 2016, Fox News named NRH2O one of the best water parks in the U.S.

In 2019, The Dallas Morning News and Fort Worth Star-Telegram named NRH2O one of the best water parks in Dallas-Fort Worth.

The water park contains the world’s largest uphill water coaster, which is the Green Extreme at 1,161 long and 81 feet tall.

The park receives more than 250,000 guests annually.

Facilities

Rides/Attractions

Body Slides
 Sidewinder
 Riggamaroll
 Thunder
 Blue Sky

Tube Slides
 Viper
 Green Extreme
Master Blaster manufactured by WhiteWater West
 Accelerator
 Purplepalooza
 Double Dipper

Pools and Play Areas
 Beachside Bay
 Frogstein’s Splashatory
 NRH2Ocean (Wave Pool)
 Endless River
 Tadpole Swimming Hole
 Sand Volleyball Court
 Stream

Revenue

Food and Beverage

 Al Gator’s Smokehouse & Grill
 Piper’s River Falls Café
 Sheldon’s Ice Cream Shop
 Eb & Flo’s Funnel Cake Lab
  Dippin' Dots Shack
 Bunsen's Cookin' Shack

Retail
 Waterford's Gift Shop

References

External links 
 Official website

Water parks in Texas
North Richland Hills, Texas
1995 establishments in Texas